Shelby Allen Laxson Sr. (January 16, 1913 - February 22, 1982), also known as Billy Laxson, was an American politician who served as a member of the Alabama House of Representatives from 1966 to 1970.

Life
Laxson was born on January 16, 1913, to Walter Robert Laxson and Carrie Sewell in Huntsville, Alabama. He married Valerie Vernon on July 21, 1934. They had 4 children together, one of them dying in 1964.

He died on February 22, 1982, at the age of 69.

Politics

State Senate
In about 1957, he finished the unexpired term of Thomas Herman Vann for District 4.

State House
He was elected for District 3 in 1966. Laxson served in Place 5 of the District. He only served one term.

References

1913 births
1982 deaths
Democratic Party Alabama state senators
Democratic Party members of the Alabama House of Representatives
20th-century American politicians